Rhagidiidae is a family of prostig mites in the order Trombidiformes. There are about 12 genera and 9 described species in Rhagidiidae.

Genera
 Arhagidia Lindquist & Zacharda, 1987
 Brevipalpia Zacharda, 1980
 Coccorhagidia Thor, 1934
 Flabellorhagidia  Elliott, 1976
 Foveacheles Zacharda, 1980
 Poecilophysis Cambridge, 1876
 Rhagidia Thorell, 1871
 Robustocheles Zacharda, 1980
 Shibaia Zacharda, 1980
 Troglocheles Zacharda, 1980
 Tuberostoma Zacharda, 1980
 Zachardaia Özdikmen, 2008

References

Further reading

 
 
 
 

Trombidiformes
Acari families